Patrizio Fimiani (born 3 January 1973 in Viterbo) is a retired Italian professional football player who played as a goalkeeper.

Career
Fimiani made his professional debut during the 1992–93 season with A.S. Roma, where he was the team's third-choice goalkeeper, after Giovanni Cervone and Giuseppe Zinetti. After the semi-final game of the Italian Cup against A.C. Milan, Cervone and Zinetti fought in the locker room. Both were disqualified for the finals and Fimiani had to play in both legs of the finals matchup against Torino F.C. Roma lost on away-goals rule (0–3 in Turin and 5–2 in Rome). That was the highlight of his career as he never played on a level higher than third-tier Serie C1 after that season.

References

1973 births
Living people
Italian footballers
Serie A players
Serie C players
Serie D players
A.S. Roma players
Catania S.S.D. players
S.S. Juve Stabia players
Benevento Calcio players
A.S.D. Castel di Sangro Calcio players
Avezzano Calcio players
Latina Calcio 1932 players
Association football goalkeepers